Dr. T. K. Sreepada Rao (born 4 June 1943) is a well known nephrologist of Indian origin in the U.S. His biggest scientific achievement is discovering two new renal diseases namely Nephropathy associated with Intravenous heroin addiction in early 1970s, and Nephropathy associated with HIV infection in early 80's. His professional achievement was to transport two cadaver donor kidneys from New York to Bombay, and participate in the renal transplantation when such concept was unknown in India.  He has more than 130 scientific publications to his credit.  He is one of the few International Medical Graduates who has a Tenured Professorship in a Medical School in the United States.

Early life
Rao was born in a Madhwa family in Kolar, Karnataka, India. He was the fifth child of T.K. Krishnamurthy Rao and Nagamma. His father was Railway Station master who died of a Heart attack when Sreepad was 6 year old.

Education
His early schooling was in Channapatna, Karnataka. He graduated from high school in First Class, establishing a record for highest marks scored in Channapatna, and in the top 15 in Karnataka State.  He graduated in First Class in Pre-University studies at National College in Bangalore, and was admitted to Bangalore Medical College.  He stayed in Ramakrishna Vidhyarthi Mandiram throughout his student career.  He completed his Medical degree from Bangalore Medical College as the top student with 5 gold medals.  After completing one year of House Surgeoncy, he left for United States in June 1967. He completed 4 years of Medical Residency at New Jersey College of Medicine hospitals in Newark and East Orange, N.J.  From 1971 to 1973, he was a fellow in Renal Medicine at State University of New York (SUNY), Downstate Medical Center and Kings County Hospitals. After passing the American Board of Internal Medicine, he was awarded a fellowship from the American College of Physicians.  Subsequently, he was also board certified in the sub-specialty of Nephrology. During his fellowship he published his original work on heroin-associated nephropathy in the prestigious New England Journal of Medicine.  In 1984, he described for the first time renal disease in patients with acquired immunodeficiency syndrome (AIDS).  His original work AIDS Associated Nephropathy was published in the New England Journal of Medicine in 1984.

Career
Rao started working at SUNY Downstate Medical Center as a nephrologist, and because of his extensive contribution to medical literature, and services to the university, he was promoted as professor of medicine, and associate director of renal diseases.  he was also the director of hemodialysis services at Kings County Hospital, and a consultant in nephrology at Brooklyn Veterans Administration Hospital.  He has published more than 130 scientific articles and chapters in text books. He is the founding member, past president, board of trustees, and CME chairman of the American Association of Physicians of Queens and Long Island chapter.

Rao was the nephrologist who cared for Jayaprakash Narayan when he visited the United States. He was also nephrologist in charge of Honorable M. G. Ramachandran, Chief Minister of Tamil Nadu, and Honorable Chenna Reddy, Chief Minister of Andrapradesh, both of whom underwent renal Organ transplantation at Downstate Medical Center in United States. He was also consultant for the Governor of Pondicherry who suffered renal insufficiency.

For his achievements he has been awarded honorary degrees from Madras University, and Manipal University. He is also honorary visiting professor at Rajiv Gandhi University in Karnataka state..y of Nephrology, Indian Association of Long Island, and Bangalore Medical College Alumni Association.  He has delivered scientific lectures in Japan, Israel, Paris, Holland, India and other countries.

He has been honored by Indian Society of Nephrology, American Nephrologists of Indian Origin, Nassau County of NY,

Personal life
Rao is married to Pushpa, and has two children. He lives in Long Island, New York.

Selected publications

References

1940s births
Living people
Indian nephrologists
People from Kolar
Manipal Academy of Higher Education alumni
Medical doctors from Karnataka